Abdul Wali Wahidzai is a former governor of Laghman Province. He was appointed 15 June 2021 and surrendered to the Taliban on 16 August 2021, ending his governorship. The Taliban had completed their 2021 Taliban offensive.

References 

Governors of Laghman Province
Living people
Year of birth missing (living people)
Place of birth missing (living people)